Trust Inc. was a Canadian radio drama series on CBC Radio One and online at CBC.ca, about a Toronto based public relations firm, starring Julie Khaner as Catherine Leger, Georgina Reilly as Serena Jordan, Elias Toufexis as Ricardo Sandoval, Matt Austin Sadowski as Ben Lederman, Thomas Michael as Marshall Whitman, and Keon Mohajeri as Parvinder Singh-Donnelly. The program was designed for both conventional broadcast and as an interactive program. The online component featured character Tweets, blogs and vlogs, YouTube video, Twitter contests and fan fiction.

Series guests included Colm Feore, Peter Outerbridge, Stephen McHattie and Ron White.

Series writers were Matthew Edison, Anita Kapila, Thomas Michael, Hannah Moscovitch, Jason Sherman and Gregory J. Sinclair.  The theme music was composed by Doug Wilde. The series was conceived, produced and directed by Gregory J. Sinclair.

The series premiered for a run of 13 episodes on January 5, 2012, at 11:31 AM EST. Trust Inc. was the last radio drama series produced by the Canadian Broadcasting Corporation. It ended after one season, when the CBC eliminated all original radio drama production in response to the budget cuts of 2012.

External links
 Official CBC website

CBC Radio One programs
Canadian radio dramas
2012 radio programme debuts